Schnarrenberg (Stuttgart) is a mountain of Baden-Württemberg, Germany.

The Schnarrenberg is a hill ridge in the north of Stuttgart in the quarters of Münster and Zuffenhausen. The majority is on the territory of Münster.
At its highest point (316 m above sea level (NN)) is the Stuttgart Weather Office, a branch of the German Weather Service. Its slopes are covered by vineyards.

Schnarrenberg Tunnel 
By Schnarrenberg, is the 272-metre-long Schnarrenberg railway tunnel. This double-tracked, electrified freight bypass line connects of the Stuttgart-Untertürkheim with Kornwestheim. The tunnel was built in 1895 and overhauled from 1999 to 2000; its brick masonry being replaced by a concrete shell.

References

Mountains and hills of Baden-Württemberg